In-Ko-Pah Gorge is a deep narrow canyon or gorge in San Diego and Imperial counties, California.

In-Ko-Pah Gorge carries the eastbound lanes of Interstate 8 through the In-Ko-Pah Mountains, while the westbound lanes use a different alignment through Devils Canyon.

History
In-Ko-Pah Gorge was originally known as Myer Canyon.

References

Valleys of Imperial County, California
Interstate 8